is a former Japanese football player. He played for Japan national team.

Club career
Kaneda was born in Fuchu, Hiroshima on February 16, 1958. After graduating from Chuo University, he joined Nissan Motors in 1980. The club won the 1983 and 1985 Emperor's Cups. From 1988 to 1990, the club won all three major titles in Japan: the Japan Soccer League, the JSL Cup, and the Emperor's Cup for two years in a row. He retired in 1991. He played 157 games and scored 21 goals while in the league. He was selected as one of the Best Eleven in 1983.

National team career
On June 15, 1977, when Kaneda was a Chuo University student, he debuted and scored a goal for the Japan national team against South Korea. At this time, he was 19 years and that was a record for the youngest goal scorer in the Japan national team. He was selected to play for Japan in the 1978 and 1982 Asian Games. He played 58 games and scored 6 goals for Japan until 1984.

Club statistics

National team statistics

References

External links

Japan National Football Team Database

1958 births
Living people
Chuo University alumni
Association football people from Hiroshima Prefecture
Japanese footballers
Japan international footballers
Japan Soccer League players
Yokohama F. Marinos players
Footballers at the 1978 Asian Games
Footballers at the 1982 Asian Games
Association football forwards
Asian Games competitors for Japan
Association football midfielders